Sthenias cylindrator is a species of beetle in the family Cerambycidae. It was described by Johan Christian Fabricius in 1801. It has a wide distribution throughout Africa. It feeds on Coffea canephora and Nerium oleander.

Subspecies
 Sthenias cylindrator cylindrator (Fabricius, 1801)
 Sthenias cylindrator ater Téocchi, 1997

References

cylindrator
Beetles described in 1801